The 2001 NCAA Division I-A football season was the first college football season of the 21st century. It ended with the University of Miami winning the national title for the fifth time.

The Hurricanes were led by Larry Coker, who was in his first year as head coach after five years as Miami's offensive coordinator under Butch Davis and became the first head coach since 1989's Dennis Erickson from the University of Miami to win a national title in his first season. Coker had the benefit of inheriting a star-studded program that Davis had rebuilt in the aftermath of NCAA sanctions in the mid-to-late '90s.  Miami completed a perfect 12–0 season, which culminated in a 37–14 win over Nebraska in the Rose Bowl BCS National Championship Game.

In yet another controversial season for the BCS, (AP) No. 4 Nebraska was chosen as the national title opponent despite not having even played in the Big 12 championship game. The Huskers went into their last regularly scheduled game at Colorado undefeated, but left Boulder having lost the game by a score of 62–36. The Buffaloes went on to win the Big 12 championship game. The BCS computers, among other things, didn't weigh later games any more heavily than earlier games, and one-loss Nebraska came out ahead of two-loss No. 3 Colorado and one-loss, No. 2 Oregon.  Some fans chanted "number 4" at the title game held at the Rose Bowl.

Florida State did not win the ACC championship for the first time since joining the conference in 1991, losing out to Maryland. Steve Spurrier left the Florida Gators at the end of the season to coach the Washington Redskins, accepting what was then the largest salary for an NFL head coach.

The season had one of the more competitive Heisman Trophy races with Eric Crouch of Nebraska winning by only a small margin over Rex Grossman of Florida. All of the five finalists played the quarterback position. Two of the finalists were coached at some point by Oregon offensive coordinator Jeff Tedford. Indiana quarterback Antwaan Randle El earned first-team All-America honors from the FWAA after becoming the first NCAA Division I-A quarterback to throw for 40 touchdowns and rush for 40 touchdowns in a career. He also became the first player in NCAA I-A history to record 2,500 total yards from scrimmage in four consecutive seasons.

Joe Paterno needed just 2 victories to pass legendary Alabama Coach Paul "Bear" Bryant as the winningest coach in Division I-A college football, However, after the Nittany Lions started the season 0–4 it looked like Bear Bryant's record would remain intact for at least 1 more year. After a 20–0 drubbing Penn State took against Michigan at home on Oct 6, the Nittany Lions were a dismal 1–6 since Paterno notched his 321st coaching win on October 28, 2000.

At Northwestern on October 20, the Lions lost a late 31–28 lead to fall behind 35–31 with two minutes to go. With their starting quarterback, Matt Senneca, out with an injury, Penn State put its collective hopes on the shoulders of redshirt freshman quarterback Zack Mills. Mills drove the Lions 69 yards in 1:41, leading Penn State to its first victory of the year by a 38–35 margin.  The victory gave Paterno 323 career wins, tying Bear Bryant's record.

A week later, Penn State hosted Ohio State, who held on to a small lead for most of the game until the Buckeyes started to pull away with a 27–9 lead following a 44-yard interception return for a touchdown by Derek Ross in the third quarter. Penn State would fight all the way back with a 69-yard touchdown run by Mills and a 26-yard pass to Tony Johnson to cut the lead to 27–22, and they would take the lead early in the fourth quarter with a 13-yard touchdown pass to Eric McCoo. Penn State's 29–27 win moved Paterno in to first place on the all-time coaching victories list with 324 wins. He would later slip behind Bobby Bowden at Florida State, but he would relinquish the top spot a few years later. Paterno remains the winningest coach in Division I-A college football with a final record of 409–136–3.

The newly formed Boise State/Fresno State rivalry would be a major factor in the race to be the "BCS buster" for several seasons. Both teams ultimately lost the race to Utah, who became the first to bust the BCS in 2004, and the first to make a second trip in 2008.

The Aloha Bowl and Oahu Bowl lost funding after Chrysler Corporation, which owned the former bowl's sponsor of Jeep, was acquired by Daimler-Benz and became DaimlerChrysler. The Aloha Bowl moved to Seattle and became the Seattle Bowl.

The New Orleans Bowl began to play, the host team being the Sun Belt champion.

End of season upsets and BCS drama
The final three weeks of the regular season saw an incredible amount of drama as several teams were in prime position to earn their way to the national championship game in the Rose Bowl. For most of November, Miami and Nebraska were the only two undefeated teams in the power conferences and clearly the top contenders for the title.  But on November 23, the day after Thanksgiving, Nebraska suffered a devastating 62–36 loss to Colorado which seemingly caused their season to fall by the wayside. Conference rival Oklahoma had been ranked third behind Nebraska and Miami in the BCS standings, but the Sooners' hopes dissolved the next day when they were upset at home by Oklahoma State 16–13. These losses affected not only the national championship race but also the Big 12 standings, as the conference championship game would now feature Texas and Colorado instead of the expected Nebraska-Oklahoma matchup.

Miami, Florida, and Texas now held the top three spots in the BCS standings heading into their games on December 1, but all three teams would be pushed to the brink in a single thrilling day. Miami barely escaped Virginia Tech 26–24 to finish as the only undefeated team in the nation and clinch a Rose Bowl berth. However, the other clubs were not so fortunate. Florida lost 34–32 to Tennessee in Gainesville; as with Nebraska and Oklahoma, the loss not only ended the Gators' national championship dreams but also kept them out of the conference title game. Later that evening, Texas entered the Big 12 finals against Colorado in prime time television knowing that a win would almost certainly seal their spot in the Rose Bowl, but the Longhorns fell 39–37 in yet another nailbiter.

After their victory over Florida, Tennessee stepped into the number two spot going into the following week's SEC Championship against LSU. However, the Volunteers felt the same sting that Nebraska, Oklahoma, Florida, and Texas had all encountered the previous few weeks. After a 31–20 upset by the Tigers, Tennessee's hopes of National Championship appearance were gone as quickly as they had come.

Miami was left at the top of all the polls, and the debate began about who deserved to play in the Rose Bowl.  Many felt Colorado was the hottest team in the country after dismantling Nebraska and then beating the Longhorns in the Big 12 title game, but their two losses at the beginning of the year were tough to ignore.  Others felt Oregon deserved the honor, being ranked in both the AP and Coaches' Polls as the number two team in the country.  Ultimately, after all of the upsets, Nebraska ended up as the number two team in the BCS, despite being the team whose loss started all of the drama three weeks earlier.

Rules changes
The NCAA Rules Committee adopted the following rules changes for the 2001 season:
 Charged team time-outs are reduced to 30 seconds if the team taking the time-out requests it.  Otherwise, team time-outs are 90 seconds in length.
 Eliminated TV/Radio time-outs during overtime periods.
 All penalties committed by the offense behind the neutral zone are enforced from the previous spot, completely repealing the 1991 rule that enforced offensive holding, clipping, and illegal use of hands occurring behind the line from the spot of the foul.
 Stopping the clock once a runner's helmet comes off.
 Runners are exempt from being called for hurdling.
 Roughing the passer penalties committed during a two-point conversion will be assessed on the ensuing kickoff or, if committed during overtime, on the succeeding spot.
 Guidelines for officials on lightning-related game issues are included in the rulebook.

Conference and program changes
One team upgraded from Division I-AA, thus increasing the number of Division I-A schools from 116 to 117.

The Big West Conference stopped sponsoring football after the 2000 season. Its remaining football-playing members departed for the WAC, the Sun Belt (see below), or independence:
Boise State joined the WAC
Utah State opted to become an Independent. 
The Sun Belt Conference, previously a non-football conference, began sponsoring football during the 2001 season, absorbing many of the Big West's former members.
Arkansas State, New Mexico State and North Texas joined from the Big West.
Idaho joined the Sun Belt as a football-only member
Louisiana–Lafayette, Louisiana–Monroe, and Middle Tennessee joined after playing as independents.
TCU joined Conference USA from the Western Athletic Conference
Louisiana Tech joined the Western Athletic Conference after five years as an independent.
Troy State joined Division I-A football this season.

Regular season top 10 matchups
Rankings reflect the AP Poll. Rankings for Week 8 and beyond will list BCS Rankings first and AP Poll second. Teams that failed to be a top 10 team for one poll or the other will be noted.
Week 5
No. 3 Oklahoma defeated No. 5 Texas, 14–3 (Cotton Bowl, Dallas, Texas)
Week 6
No. 7 UCLA defeated No. 10 Washington, 35–13 (Rose Bowl, Pasadena, California)
Week 8
No. 2/3 Nebraska defeated No. 1/2 Oklahoma, 20–10 (Memorial Stadium, Lincoln, Nebraska)
Week 13
No. 6/5 Tennessee defeated No. 2/2 Florida, 34–32 (Ben Hill Griffin Stadium, Gainesville, Florida)
No. 7/9 Colorado defeated No. 3/3 Texas, 39–37 (2001 Big 12 Championship Game, Texas Stadium, Irving, Texas)

Conference standings

Bowl Championship Series rankings

Final BCS standings
 Miami
 Nebraska
 Colorado
 Oregon
 Florida
 Tennessee
 Texas
 Illinois
 Stanford
 Maryland
 Oklahoma
 Washington State
 LSU
 South Carolina
 Washington
Source:

Bowl games

BCS bowls
Rose Bowl: No. 1 Miami (FL) (BCS No. 1) 37, No. 4 Nebraska (BCS No. 2) 14
Fiesta Bowl: No. 2 Oregon (Pac-10 champ) 38, No. 3 Colorado (Big 12 champ) 16
Sugar Bowl: No. 12 LSU (SEC champ) 47, No. 7 Illinois (Big 10 champ) 34
Orange Bowl: No. 5 Florida (At Large) 56, No. 6 Maryland (ACC champ) 23

Other New Year's Day bowls
Cotton Bowl Classic: No. 10 Oklahoma 10, Arkansas 3
Florida Citrus Bowl: No. 8 Tennessee 45, No. 17 Michigan 17
Gator Bowl: No. 24 Florida State 30, No. 15 Virginia Tech 17
Outback Bowl: No. 14 South Carolina 31, No. 22 Ohio State 28

December bowl games
Holiday Bowl: No. 9 Texas 47, No. 21 Washington 43
Peach Bowl: North Carolina 16, Auburn 10
Tangerine Bowl: Pittsburgh 34, NC State 19
Sun Bowl: No. 13 Washington State 33, Purdue 27
Independence Bowl: Alabama 14, Iowa State 13
Alamo Bowl: Iowa 19, Texas Tech 16
Insight.com Bowl: No. 18 Syracuse 26, Kansas State 3
Liberty Bowl: No. 23 Louisville (C-USA champ) 28, No. 19 BYU (MWC champ) 10
Humanitarian Bowl: Clemson 49, Louisiana Tech (WAC Champ) 24
Motor City Bowl: No. 25 Toledo (MAC Champ) 23, Cincinnati 16
Seattle Bowl: Georgia Tech 24, No. 11 Stanford 14
Music City Bowl: Boston College 20, No. 16 Georgia 16
Las Vegas Bowl: Utah 10, Southern California 6
GMAC Bowl: Marshall 64, East Carolina 61 (2 OT)
Silicon Valley Classic: Michigan State 44, No. 20 Fresno State 35
Galleryfurniture.com bowl: Texas A&M 28, TCU 9
New Orleans Bowl: Colorado State 45, North Texas (Sun Belt Champ) 20

Heisman Trophy voting
The Heisman Memorial Trophy Award is given to the Most Outstanding Player of the year.

 Eric Crouch, Nebraska, Quarterback (770 points)
 Rex Grossman, Florida (708 points)
 Ken Dorsey, Miami-FL (638 points)
 Joey Harrington, Oregon (364 points)
 David Carr, Fresno St. (101 points)

Other annual awards
Maxwell Award (College Player of the Year) – Ken Dorsey, Miami
Walter Camp Award (Back) – Eric Crouch, Nebraska
Davey O'Brien Award (Quarterback) – Eric Crouch, Nebraska
Johnny Unitas Golden Arm Award (Senior Quarterback) – David Carr, Fresno State
Doak Walker Award (Running back) – Luke Staley, BYU
Fred Biletnikoff Award (Wide receiver) – Josh Reed, Louisiana State
John Mackey Award (Tight end) – Daniel Graham, Colorado
Dave Rimington Trophy (Center) – LeCharles Bentley, Ohio State
Bronko Nagurski Trophy (Defensive Player) – Roy Williams, Oklahoma
Chuck Bednarik Award – Julius Peppers, North Carolina
Dick Butkus Award (Linebacker) – Rocky Calmus, Oklahoma
Lombardi Award (Lineman or Linebacker) – Julius Peppers, North Carolina
Outland Trophy (Interior Lineman) – Bryant McKinnie, Miami, OT
Jim Thorpe Award (Defensive back) – Roy Williams, Oklahoma
Lou Groza Award (Placekicker) – Seth Marler, Tulane
Ray Guy Award (Punter) – Travis Dorsch, Purdue
Paul "Bear" Bryant Award – Larry Coker, Miami
The Home Depot Coach of the Year Award: Ralph Friedgen, Maryland

References